The Mayor of Batticaloa is the head of Batticaloa Municipal Council.

List of mayors
The following were some of the city's mayors and chairmen:

Chairmen
 G. N. Tisseveresinghe - 1935 
 M. Chinnaiyah - 1936-38
 N. S. Rasiah - 1939-41
 S. A. Selvanayagam - 1942-44
 K. V. M. Subramaniam - 1945-47
 J. L. Tisseveresinghe - 1951-53
 D. Velupillai - 1954-56
 A.S.T Canagasabey-1957-1959

Mayors
 C. Rajadurai - 1967-68
 J. L. Tisseveresinghe - 1968-70
 K. Thiyagarajah - 1971-73
 E. Ambalavanar - 1983
 Chilyan Perinpanayagam - 1994-99
 Sivageetha Prabhakaran - 2008 - 2013
 Saravanabawan Thiyagarajah-2018

References

Batticaloa